Sukaj is an Albanian surname. Notable people with the surname include:

Adrian Sukaj (born 1967), Albanian footballer
Bashkim Sukaj (born 1992), Swiss football player of Kosovan-Albanian origin
Xhevahir Sukaj (born 1987), Albanian football forward 

Albanian-language surnames